Fort C. F. Smith may refer to:

Fort C.F. Smith (Bowling Green, Kentucky), listed on the National Register of Historic Places in Warren County, Kentucky
Fort C. F. Smith (Fort Smith, Montana)
Fort C. F. Smith (Arlington, Virginia)

See also
Fort C. F. Smith Historic District (disambiguation)